Bogart is a settlement in the municipality of Tweed, Hastings County, Ontario, Canada, about  south of the community of Sulphide and  east of the village of Tweed. The Clare River, a tributary of the Moira River, flows through the community.

References

Communities in Hastings County